Patricio Maldonado (born March 25, 1985 in Santiago, Chile) is a Chilean footballer currently playing for San Luis Quillota of the Primera División B in Chile.

Teams
  Colo-Colo 2004
  Universidad de Concepción 2005
  Colo-Colo 2006
  Unión San Felipe 2007
  Deportes Iquique 2008-2009
  San Luis Quillota 2010–present

External links
 
 

1985 births
Living people
Chilean footballers
Universidad de Concepción footballers
San Luis de Quillota footballers
Deportes Iquique footballers
Unión San Felipe footballers
Colo-Colo footballers
Primera B de Chile players
Chilean Primera División players
Association footballers not categorized by position